Twice in a Lifetime is a 1985 drama film directed by Bud Yorkin and starring Gene Hackman as a married steelworker in a mid-life crisis who becomes attracted to another woman, played by Ann-Margret. Ellen Burstyn, Amy Madigan, Ally Sheedy, and Brian Dennehy co-star.

Paul McCartney composed and performed the theme song to the film, heard over the end credits. It remained commercially unavailable as a recording until 1993 when it was included as a bonus track on a reissue of McCartney's album Pipes of Peace.

Plot
Harry Mackenzie works in a factory by day and comes home to a comfortable marriage at night, but it lacks excitement and passion. For his 50th birthday, his wife Kate blithely tells him to just go to his favorite corner tavern and have a good time.

An attractive barmaid, Audrey Minelli, captures his interest. Harry falls for her, and before long, shocks Kate by requesting a divorce. This decision horrifies their daughters, particularly Sunny, who is having a difficult marriage of her own, and Helen, who is about to be wed.

Kate goes through a difficult period of adjustment. She eventually lands a job in a beauty salon, changes her appearance, and tries to adopt a new outlook on life. By the time Harry attends his daughter Helen's wedding, most members of the family have found ways to move on.

Cast
Gene Hackman as Harry Mackenzie
Ann-Margret as Audrey Minelli 
Ellen Burstyn as Kate Mackenzie
Amy Madigan as Sunny Mackenzie-Sobel
Ally Sheedy as Helen Mackenzie
Brian Dennehy as Nick
Stephen Lang as Keith
Darrell Larson as Jerry

Release
The film premiered at the Seattle International Film Festival on May 9, 1985. It opened on Wednesday, October 23, 1985, at the Beekman Theatre in New York, grossing $68,039 in its opening week, and then it opened in Los Angeles, Seattle and Toronto the following week.

Awards
Hackman received a Golden Globe nomination for Best Performance by an Actor in a Motion Picture - Drama. Amy Madigan received nominations from both the Golden Globes and the Oscars for best supporting actress.

References

External links

Twice in a Lifetime at the Internet Movie Database

1985 films
Films directed by Bud Yorkin
1985 drama films
American drama films
British drama films
1980s English-language films
1980s American films
1980s British films